The 2018 ITTF-ATTU Asian Cup (also known as the 2018 Lion ITTF-ATTU Asian Cup for sponsorship reasons) was a table tennis competition that took place from 6–8 April in Yokohama, Japan. The event was organised by the Japan Table Tennis Association (JTTA), under the authority of the International Table Tennis Federation (ITTF) and the Asian Table Tennis Union (ATTU). It was the 31st edition of the event, and the third time that it had been held in Japan.

Men's singles and women's singles events were held, and the three medallists in each event qualified automatically for the 2018 Men's and Women's World Cups.

Medalists

Qualification

In both the men's and women's singles events, the reigning Asian Champion and Asian Cup Champion qualified, along with the 10 highest-ranked Asian players in the January 2018 ITTF World Ranking. The final four places were awarded to regional representatives from Middle Asia, South Asia, Southeast Asia and West Asia. Qualification was subject to a maximum of two players from any association.

Men's singles

Women's singles

Format

The first stage of both the men's and women's singles competitions consisted of four groups playing a round robin system, where each player played the other players in their group once. The top two players in Groups A, B and C qualified directly to the second stage. The third player from Groups A, B and C joined the winner of the Continental Group in play-off matches to decide the final two places in the second stage.

The second stage consisted of a single knockout draw to decide the top eight positions.

Men's singles

Seeding

Players were seeded according to the April 2018 ITTF World Ranking.

Group stage

The group stage took place on 6 April.

Group A

Group B

Group C

Continental Group

Play-offs

Main draw

The main draw took place on 7 and 8 April.

5th-8th place play-off

Women's singles

Seeding

Players were seeded according to the April 2018 ITTF World Ranking.

Group stage

The group stage took place on 6 April.

Group A

Group B

Group C

Continental Group

Play-offs

Main draw

The main draw took place on 7 and 8 April.

5th-8th place play-off

See also

 2018 Europe Top 16 Cup
 2018 ITTF-Oceania Cup
 2018 ITTF Pan-America Cup

References

Asian Cup (table tennis)
Asian Cup
Asian Cup (table tennis)
Table tennis competitions in Japan
Asian Cup (table tennis)
Asian Cup (table tennis)
Asian Cup (table tennis)